The following highways are numbered 12D:

United States
 Nebraska Spur 12D
 New York State Route 12D
 Secondary State Highway 12-D (Washington) (former)

See also
List of highways numbered 12